Khumbu (also known as the Everest Region) is a region of northeastern Nepal on the Nepalese side of Mount Everest. It is part of the Solukhumbu District, which in turn is part of Province No. 1.  Khumbu is one of three subregions of the main Kirat Kulung  and Sherpa settlement of the Himalaya, the other two being Solu and Pharak. It includes the town of Namche Bazaar as well as the villages of Thame, Khumjung, Pangboche, Pheriche and Kunde. The famous Buddhist monastery at Tengboche is also located in the Khumbu.

The Khumbu's elevation ranges from 3,300 metres (11,000 feet) to the 8,848.86 m (29,032 ft) summit of Mount Everest, the highest place on Earth.
The Khumbu region includes both Sagarmatha National Park (above Monju) and the Sagarmatha National Park Buffer Zone, between Lukla and Monju.

The Khumbu is a glacier believed to be the result of the last great Ice Age, ~500,000 years ago.

Lonely Planet has ranked Khumbu region in sixth best region in the world to travel.

Sherpa Clans in  Khumbu Region are Salakha, Murminso, Thaktok, Garza, Lhakshindo, Chusherwa or Ngonba , Luakpa or Chawa, Sakhya, Shyango

Villages in the Khumbu region 
 Dingboche
 Kunde
 Khumjung
 Lobuche
 Lukla
 Namche Bazaar
 Tengboche
 Phortse
 Thame
 Thamo
 Pangboche
 Phakding
 Monjo

References

External links

Regions of Nepal
Solukhumbu District
Khumbu Pasanglhamu
Mountain ranges of Nepal